Frank Ocean and his music have received many award nominations and wins. As of February 2017, he won two Grammys, a Soul Train and UK Music Award. In addition, he earned accolades from GQ, NME, and Vibe magazines, as well as the BBC and mtvU.

Attitude Magazine Awards
The Attitude Magazine (Gay, Men's Lifestyle). The annual awards are dedicated to honouring those who inspire and make change, making LGBT+ lives easier, influence and entertain. Attitude Awards winners are those who use their platform to show how talented and diverse the LGBT+ community is, whether they identify as LGBT+ or not, take the time to fight our corner. Ocean has received one award from one nomination. 

|-
| 2016
| Frank Ocean
| Artist of The Year 
| 
|-

BET Hip Hop Awards
The BET Hip Hop Awards are hosted annually by BET for hip hop performers, producers and music video directors. Ocean has received two nominations.

|-
| rowspan="2"|2011 
| Nostalgia, Ultra
| Best Mixtape
| 
|-
| Frank Ocean
| Rookie of the Year
| 
|-

Billboard Music Awards
The Billboard Music Awards honor artists for commercial performance in the U.S., based on record charts published by Billboard. The awards are based on sales data by Nielsen SoundScan and radio information by Nielsen Broadcast Data Systems. The award ceremony was held from 1990 to 2007, until its reintroduction in 2011. Before and after that time span, winners have been announced by Billboard, both in the press and as part of their year-end issue. Ocean has received four nominations. 

|-
| rowspan="2"|2013
| Channel Orange
| Top R&B Album 
| 
|-
| Thinkin Bout You
| Top R&B Song 
| 
|-
| rowspan="2"|2017
| Frank Ocean
| Top R&B Artist
| 
|-
| Blonde
| Top R&B Album 
|

Brit Awards
The Brit Awards are the British Phonographic Industry's annual pop music awards, and the British equivalent to the American Grammy Award. Ocean has received one award from one nomination. 

|-
| 2013
| Frank Ocean
| International Male Artist
| 
|-

GLAAD Media Awards
The GLAAD Media Awards were created in 1990 by the Gay & Lesbian Alliance Against Defamation to "recognize and honor media for their fair, accurate and inclusive representations of the LGBT community and the issues that affect their lives." Ocean has received one award from two nominations.  

|-
| 2013 
| Channel Orange 
| Outstanding Music Artist 
| 
|-
| 2017 
| Blonde
| Outstanding Music Artist 
| 
|-

Grammis
The Grammis Awards are the Swedish equivalent of the Grammy Awards. Ocean has received one nomination. 

|-
| 2012
| rowspan="2"| Nostalgia, Ultra
| International Album of the Year
| 
|-

Grammy Awards 
The Grammy Awards are awarded annually by the National Academy of Recording Arts and Sciences. Ocean has received two awards from eight nominations. 

|-
| rowspan="6"|2013
| rowspan="2"|Channel Orange
| Album of the Year
|
|-
| Best Urban Contemporary Album
|
|-
| "Thinkin Bout You"
| Record of the Year
| 
|-
| rowspan=2|"No Church in the Wild"(with Kanye West & Jay-Z)
| Best Rap/Sung Collaboration
| 
|-
| Best Short Form Music Video
| 
|-
| Frank Ocean
| Best New Artist
| 
|-
|2014
|"New Slaves" (as songwriter)
|Best Rap Song
|
|-
|2015
|Beyoncé (as featured artist)
|Album of the Year
|

Note: Ocean was nominated for Best Rap Song at the 56th Grammy Awards, for said nomination he was credited as Christopher Breaux and shared the nomination with Ben Bronfman, Mike Dean, Louis Johnson, Malik Jones, Elon Rutberg, Sakiya Sandifer, Che Smith, Kanye West, Travis Scott and Cydell Young.

GQ Awards 

|-
| 2011
| Frank Ocean
| Rookie of the Year
| 
|-

HipHopDX Awards 
The HipHopDX Awards are annual year-end awards hosted by online Hip-Hop magazine HipHopDX.

|-
| 2011 
| Nostalgia, Ultra
| Best Non-Hip Hop Album of the Year 
| 
|-
| 2012 
| Channel Orange
| Best Non-Hip Hop Album of the Year 
| 
|-

Los Premios 40 Principales 
The Los Premios 40 Principales is an award presented by the musical radio station Los 40 Principales. It was created in 2006 to celebrate their fortieth anniversary. Ocean has received one nomination. 

|-
| 2016
| Frank Ocean
| Best Artist or Group - Critic's Choice
| 
|-

MOBO Awards
The Music of Black Origin (MOBO) Awards were established in 1996 by Kanya King. They are held annually in the United Kingdom to recognize artists of any race or nationality performing music of black origin. Ocean has received two nominations. 

|-
|| 2012
| rowspan="2"|Frank Ocean
| rowspan="2"|Best International Act
| 
|-
|2016 
| 
|-

MTV

MTV Video Music Awards
The MTV Video Music Awards were established in 1984 by MTV to celebrate the top music videos of the year. Ocean has received three nominations.

|-
| rowspan="3"|2012
| rowspan="3"|"Swim Good"
| Best Direction
| 
|-
| Best Male Video
| 
|-
| Best New Artist
| 
|-

MTV Video Music Awards Japan
The MTV Video Music Awards Japan is the Japanese version of the MTV Video Music Awards. Initially, Japan was part of the MTV Asia Awards, which were part all Asian countries, but because of the musical variety existent in Japan, a factor that neighboring countries have not, in May 2002 they began to hold their own awards independently. Ocean has received one nomination.

|-
| 2013
| "Pyramids"
| Best R&B Video 
| 
|-

mtvU
mtvU is an American digital cable television network that is owned by Viacom Music and Entertainment Group, a unit of the Viacom Media Networks division of Viacom. In addition to distribution on conventional cable systems, the channel is available to more than 750 college and university campuses across the United States as part of internally originated cable systems that are a part of on-campus housing or college closed-circuit television systems. Ocean has received one award from one nomination.   

|-
| 2012
|Frank Ocean
|Man of the Year
|
|-

mtvU Woodie Awards 
mtvU, a division of MTV Networks owned by Viacom, broadcasts a 24-hour television channel available on more than 750 college and university campuses across the United States. mtvU holds an annual awards show, the mtvU Woodie Awards, in which winners are determined by online voting. Ocean has received two nominations.

|-
| 2012
| rowspan="2"|Frank Ocean
| Woodie of the Year
| 
|-
| 2013
| FOMO (Fear of Missing Out) Woodie
|

NME Awards
The NME Awards is an annual music awards show in the United Kingdom, founded by the music magazine, NME (New Musical Express). The first awards show was held in 1953 as the NME Poll Winners Concerts, shortly after the founding of the magazine. Though the accolades given are entirely genuine, the ceremony itself is usually carried out in a humorous and jovial manner. Ocean has received one award from one nomination. 

|-
| 2017 
| Frank Ocean
| International Male Artist 
| 
|-

O Music Awards
The MTV O Music Awards is one of the major annual awards established by MTV to honor the art, creativity, personality and technology of music into the digital space. Ocean has received three nominations.

|-
| 2012
| rowspan="2"|Frank Ocean
| Best Web Born Artist
| 
|-
| 2013
| Must Follow Artist on Twitter
| 
|-
| 2013
| "Pyramids"
| Too Much Ass for TV
|

Q Awards
The Q Award were a United Kingdom's annual music awards run by the music magazine Q to honor musical excellence. Winners were voted by readers of Q online, with others decided by a judging panel. Ocean has received one nomination.

|-
|| 2012
| Frank Ocean
| Q's Next Big Thing
| 
|-

Soul Train Music Awards
The Soul Train Music Awards is an annual award show aired in national broadcast syndication that honors the best in African American music and entertainment established in 1987. Ocean has received one award from two nominations. 

|-
| 2011
| Frank Ocean
| Best New Artist
| 
|-
| 2012
| Channel Orange
|Album of the Year 
|
|-

UK Music Video Awards
The UK Music Video Awards is an annual award ceremony founded in 2008 to recognise creativity, technical excellence and innovation in music videos and moving images for music. Ocean has received one award from two nominations.

|-
|| 2012 
| "Novacane"
| Best Urban Video – International
| 
|-
|| 2013 
| "Pyramids" 
| Best Pop Video – International
|

Vibe Magazine
Vibe is an American music and entertainment magazine founded by producer Quincy Jones. The publication predominantly features R&B and hip-hop music artists, actors and other entertainers. The magazine's target demographic is predominantly young, urban followers of hip-hop culture. Ocean has received one award from one nomination.  

|-
| 2012 
|Frank Ocean
|Man of the Year
|
|-

Webby Awards
The Webby Award is an award for excellence on the Internet presented annually by The International Academy of Digital Arts and Sciences. Categories include websites, interactive advertising, online film and video, and mobile. Ocean has received one award from one nomination. 

|-
| 2013 
| Frank Ocean
| Person of the Year
| 
|-

References

Awards
Ocean, Frank